Radical 114 or radical track meaning "rump" or "track" is one of the 23 Kangxi radicals (214 radicals in total) composed of 5 strokes.

In the Kangxi Dictionary, there are 12 characters (out of 49,030) to be found under this radical.

 is not listed in the Table of Indexing Chinese Character Components, hence not used as a Simplified Chinese radical (indexing component).

Evolution

Derived characters

Variant forms 
The radical character as an independent Chinese character takes different forms in different languages.

When used as a component, its form depends on not only languages but also characters.

Literature

External links

Unihan Database - U+79B8

114